The Van Straelen class was a ship class of sixteen minesweepers that were built in the Netherlands for the Royal Netherlands Navy (RNN). They were taken into service of the RNN between 1960 and 1962 and served until 1 March 1983.

Design and construction
The ships were designed in the Netherlands and build between 1958 and 1962 at several different Dutch shipyards. The costs of the class was split between the United States and the Netherlands. The United states paid under the Mutual Defense Assistance Program (MDAP) for the construction of eight ships and the Netherlands paid for the other eight ships.

To sweep mines the ships were equipped with the W Mk 7, ME 31 to ME 33 and the AX Mk 6B or 4V. Furthermore, they could be equipped with the M Mk 6h which would give the ships a magnetic sweeping ability.

Service history
The minesweepers were used to sweep mines in shallow and narrow inland waters.

Ships in class
The ships were named after officers, sailors and other personnel of the Royal Netherlands Navy that distinguished themselves during the Second World War and/or the Indonesian War of Independence and were awarded posthumously either the Military Order of William or  Bronze Cross for their service.

Notes

Citations

References
 
 
 
 
 

Mine warfare vessel classes
Minesweepers of the Royal Netherlands Navy